Henry Harris (born c. 1965) is a former American college football player, who was a linebacker at the University of Georgia in Athens. In 1982, while attending Columbia High School in Decatur, Georgia, he was named USA Today Defensive Player of the Year and was named in their All-USA high school team.

Harris never played in the National Football League.

Currently, he is the Facilities and Equipment manager at Alabama A&M University.

References

1960s births
Living people
People from Decatur, Georgia
Players of American football from Georgia (U.S. state)
Sportspeople from DeKalb County, Georgia
American football linebackers
Georgia Bulldogs football players
Alabama A&M University people